A gaming convention is a gathering centered on role-playing games, collectible card games, miniatures wargames, board games, video games, or other types of games. These conventions are typically two or three days long, and often held at either a university or in a convention center hotel.

The largest gaming convention, Spiel, is a trade fair held in Essen, Germany that focuses on German-style board games and RPGs. A similarly large event is Festival Ludique International de Parthenay (FLIP), a games festival held over twelve days in France. The annual Gamescom in Cologne is the world's leading expo for video games.

While games are often a large part of science fiction conventions and other hobby conventions, gaming conventions are distinguished by focusing on games and game-industry guests. The Penny Arcade Expo is the largest gaming convention in the US, with over 70,000 attendees at both its East (Boston) and Prime (Seattle) events. Gen Con has an emphasis on RPGs and features events for RPGs, CCGs, miniatures and boardgames with 60,000+ unique attendees over four days in 2017. Origins focuses on miniatures wargames and boardgames with 12,902 unique attendees in 2014, but also has a large component of RPG and CCG players. DragonCon is an example of a large convention with a focus on popular culture and comics that includes a large gaming contingent and 35,000-40,000 attendees, but isn't dedicated solely as a gaming convention. A smaller genre of gaming conventions are those devoted to the hobby of historical miniature wargaming.

World Boardgaming Championships, PrezCon and Euro Quest are game conventions representing the hobby of Tournament Board Gaming Open Gaming, Demos, Jr. Events and more dedicated to the face to face board game hobby. The World Boardgaming Championships and PrezCon are considered two of the largest events dedicated solely to board games. WBC runs the first week in August each year and PrezCon runs the last week of February each year.



Events
Gaming conventions typically have games scheduled for various time slots. Most gaming cons use some system of pre-registration to ensure that games are neither over-full nor under-full.

Competitive games, such as Magic: The Gathering, typically have tournaments set out where players meet in matches. Prizes can be quite large for the winners. There are also competitive role-playing games, where the best roleplayers, most successful parties, etc. get rewarded. The RPGA runs competitive D&D and other RPGs at many conventions. Most scheduled RPGs, however, are not competitive.

The types of games often include many of the following:

 Collectible Card Games (CCGs), like Magic: The Gathering and Pokémon
 Board games
 Role-playing games (RPGs), like Dungeons & Dragons, Pathfinder, Shadowrun, and Traveller
 RPGA games
 Table-top miniatures games like Battletech, HeroClix, Car Wars, Flames of War and Warhammer 40k
 LARPs
 Electronic games

Open gaming goes on throughout any such convention, and it is common that all seating in common areas will be taken by people playing pick-up games. Pick-up gaming is not generally discouraged by the convention management; in fact, pick-up games are a large part of the appeal of gaming conventions.

There is almost always a dealers' room where various game manufacturers and related companies sell their products. Many game companies choose game cons to reveal new products. Creating consumer excitement is greatly facilitated at gaming cons, but word can spread fast, and games may equally well become instant failures at conventions.

Often there are other activities at a gaming convention as well.  Costume balls, art auctions, and screenings of movies may all take place. Lectures, workshops, or panel discussions on gaming might be part of the programming, or for some cons, even the focus.

See also
List of gaming conventions

References

External links
 GamingCons.com
 GameConventionCentral.com
 EventsForGamers.com
 History of Gaming Conventions
 The Gaming convention library of Alexandria.dk

 
Nerd culture